Neocolours is a Filipino rock band formed in 1987, out of the remnants of a mid-1980s vocal group, in Manila, Philippines. Founding members were: Ito Rapadas  (vocalist), Jimmy Antiporda (keyboard), Marvin Querido (2nd keyboards), Josel Jimenez (guitar), Paku Herrera (bass) and Nino Regalado (drums). At that time the pop music genre in the Philippines was dominated by solo singers. Neocolours filled in the pop music void with the release of their first album, Making It in 1988. The said album reached platinum sales, and helped usher in a new era in the Philippine recording industry that is now known as the early 1990s band explosion.

The second album Tuloy Pa Rin came out in 1990, and created more hit singles for the band. It similarly reached platinum status and cemented several tracks as classic "OPM" songs to this day. The band, however, reached a plateau with the relatively poor sales of the third album Truth and Consequence in 1992. Various founding members made their exit in 1991 and 1992. Josel Jimenez was the first one to leave in 1991 and returned to his hometown of Davao City. Jack Rufo replaced him. Marvin Querido similarly decided to leave in 1992, and pursued a career as a session keyboardist and musical arranger. With the varying interests of the members and a dip in public interest the band, the remaining members agreed to retire the name in 1994.

Encouraged once more by a resurgent interest from its fans, the band decided in 1999 to do a "re-recording" of old hits from the past albums and compile those into a rehashed package. Additional bonus songs were especially produced for the one of which, "Kasalanan Ko Ba", became a radio hit.  The resultant album, entitled Emerge: The Best of Neocolours, reached double platinum sales in the Philippines, it was produced by Universal Records Philippines which is Ito Rapadas is also the label manager of the music company.

Neocolours songs have been covered repeatedly by various artists through the years, which contributed to the band's stature as a relevant 1980s pop act.  Their songs were utilized in various commercials, movie and television show themes.

Current undertakings
Keyboardist Jimmy Antiporda heads his own company JAM Creations, a company involved in music production and film/video productions for TV and radio commercials, album recordings and music videos. He also owns a music school named Music Master: Music School and Recording Arts, located in Capitol Hills, where he teaches Music Production. Jimmy has also composed top-charting songs for different artists.

Lead vocalist Ito Rapadas, who is also a songwriter, is the Original Pilipino Music (OPM) production department managing director for Universal Records. Rapadas has produced and overseen important album works for the past years at Universal Records.  His latest works are as follows: the chart topping and quadruple platinum APO Hiking Society tribute album Kami Napo Muna, Lani Misalucha's 2006 gold record album and the best selling and gold record light jazz album of 2007 - In Love With Bacharach.

Meanwhile, guitarist Jack Rufo had emerged as one of the Philippine industry's most sought after pop-rock producers and session guitarists. His original piece "aratig" is one of the best guitar exhibitions in the Philippines. His most outstanding work was for Kitchie Nadal's multi-platinum selling second album in 2004. He has since collaborated and produced pop-rock albums and songs by Janella Salvador, Daniel Padilla, Jericho Rosales, Kyla, Barbie Almabis, Yeng Constantino, Rocksteddy and Rivermaya. He continues to arrange, compose and produce top selling tracts and singles in the music industry.

Niño Regalado is widely recognized as one of the Philippines' most able session drummers. He continues to play for top singers and regularly plays for popular variety TV shows. He is also a producer, composer and music arranger.

Paku Herrera manages his own business in Manila and remains active with his music career.

Josel Jimenez stayed out of music related activities, but recently returned once more to band music with a group he formed in Davao City.

Marvin Querido is a musical director and arranger. He is sought after by many recording artists such as Gary Velanciano, Lani Misalucha, Sarah Geronimo and Piolo Pascual. He is currently the owner of his own recording studio, On Q, and he is in-demand by famous artists and singer such as Martin Nievera, Anne Curtis, Angeline Quinto, and Lea Salonga.

Discography
Studio albums
Making It (1988) (Format: CD, cassette, digital download, reel-to-reel tape)
Tuloy Pa Rin (1990) (Format: CD, cassette)
Truth & Consequence (1992) (Format: CD, cassette)
Emerge: The Best of Neocolours (1999) (Format: LP record, CD, cassette, digital download)

Compilation albums
Rediscovered (2004)

Singles
"Bahala na kaya"
"Here I Am Again"
"Hold On"
"Maybe"
"Tuloy Pa Rin"
"Say You'll Never Go"
"Kasalanan ko ba"

Awards

References

Filipino pop music groups
Filipino rock music groups
Universal Records (Philippines) artists
Musical groups from Manila
Musical groups established in 1987
Musical groups disestablished in 1994